By its constitution, Egypt has a multi-party system. However, in practice the National Democratic Party was the long-time ruling party and dominated the Egyptian political arena up until the Egyptian Revolution of 2011, which ousted NDP president Hosni Mubarak. Under Mubarak, opposition parties were allowed, but were widely considered to have no real chance of gaining power. As of 8 June 2014, Abdel Fattah el-Sisi is the president.

On 28 March 2011, the Supreme Council of the Armed Forces introduced the Political Party Law, which eases restrictions on the legal establishment of new political parties in Egypt. The legislation has still however been criticized as discriminatory. Under the law new parties are now required to have at least 5,000 members from at least ten of Egypt's provinces. Originally, new parties were only required to have 1,000 members. This was cited as a barrier for new parties before parliamentary elections which took place at the end of 2011 and beginning of 2012. Also, new party leaders are required to raise at least LE1 million to publish the names of the founding members in two widely circulated dailies, seen as favoring wealthier interests. Also, no parties are able to form on the basis of religion or class, ruling out the formation of Islamic and labor parties. However, in practice, religious parties have been allowed. After first being denied a license by the political parties commission, the Supreme Administrative Court allowed Gamaa Islamiya to form the Building and Development Party. The political parties commission allowed the Al Nour Party to be approved in May 2011, in part because it does not refer to the hudud in their electoral program. An article on the Daily News Egypt website states that religious parties have gone around the ban by not explicitly advocating a state based on Islam in their political programs. The 2014 Egyptian constitution bans parties based on religious grounds, though a similar law that was previously in effect did not bar Islamists from running in the 2012 presidential election or the 2011–12 parliamentary elections.  
In December 2020, final results of the parliamentary election confirmed a clear majority of the seats for Egypt’s Mostaqbal Watn (Nation’s Future) Party, which strongly supports president El-Sisi. The party even increased its majority, partly because of new electoral rules.

Full List of Parties
Egyptian politics are subject to unique circumstances and often defy simple classification in terms of the political spectrum. Currently, over 100 registered political parties in Egypt exist. Groups are sometimes associated with the political left or right, especially in international circles, according to their stance on issues. While the current Egyptian constitution prohibits the formation of political parties based on religion, there are parties that seek to establish Islamic sharia laws, or uphold the article in the constitution that states that sharia law is the main source of legislation, and others that support the formation of a secular state. The following is a categorization of political parties based on their social, economical, and political orientation, as well as their legal status:

Active parties

Parties represented in the House of Representatives or the Senate

Non-represented parties

Active Egyptian political alliances

Inactive Egyptian political alliances

See also
Politics of Egypt
Lists of political parties

References

External links
 Vote Compass Egypt Political compass for voting in Egyptian elections
 Al Jazeera English – Explainer: Egypt's crowded political arena Political parties and alliances in Egypt
 قائمة الأحزاب السياسية في مصر political parties in Egypt Official Website (Arabic)
 امسک فلول  List of remnants from Hosni Mubarak's regime seeking election (Arabic)

Political parties in Egypt, List of
Egypt
 
Political parties
Egypt